The Junkers Ju 89 was a heavy bomber designed for the Luftwaffe prior to World War II. Two prototypes were constructed, but the project was abandoned without the aircraft entering production. Elements of its design were incorporated into later Junkers aircraft.

Development

From the very beginnings of the Luftwaffe in 1933, General Walther Wever, the chief of staff, realised the importance that strategic bombing would play in any future conflict. A Langstrecken-Grossbomber ("long-range big bomber") was needed to fulfill this role.

Under the Ural bomber programme, he began secret talks with two of Nazi Germany's leading aircraft manufacturers - Dornier and Junkers - requesting designs for a long-range bomber. The two companies responded with the Dornier Do 19 and the Junkers Ju 89, respectively, and the Reichsluftfahrtministerium (RLM) ordered prototypes for both aircraft in 1935.  The RLM request asked for two prototypes and a prototype series of nine aircraft.

The Ju 89 and its competitor, the Dornier Do 19, both proved promising, but fell victim to a change of direction within the Luftwaffe. Wever was killed in a plane crash in 1936. His successors – Albert Kesselring, Ernst Udet, and Hans Jeschonnek – favoured smaller, tactical aircraft, since they could be used to support army operations; they also did not require as much material and manpower. They were proponents of the dive bomber (Ju 87 Stuka) and the doctrine of close support and destruction of the opposing airforces on the battle-ground rather than through attacking enemy industry.

They convinced Hermann Göring by emphasising the need for tactical bombers to act in an army support role. Albert Kesselring, Wever's successor, believed that what Germany required were more fighters and tactical bombers. 

Also Kesselring and Jeschonnek had suggested to Göring that it would be better to drop heavy bomber projects due to material shortages. Around 2.5 tactical bombers could be built with the same material as one heavy bomber. In May 1937 Göring is reported as saying to Erhard Milch ‘The Führer does not ask me how big my bombers are, but how many there are’ 

While these beliefs seemed validated by Germany's early successes in the Blitzkrieg, the lack of strategic bombing capability severely hampered the Luftwaffe in the Battle of Britain and Operation Barbarossa.

First prototype
On 11 April 1937, the Ju 89 prototype D-AFIT (V1, c/n 4911) was first flown by Hesselbach. Just 2½ weeks after the first flight, on 29 April 1937, the further development of both strategic bombers was cancelled by the RLM. The reason for this step was the high fuel consumption of heavy bombers, as well as because a large number of bombers could only be manufactured if these bombers were medium bombers, like the Ju 88.

Second prototype
Junkers completed the second Ju 89 prototype D-ALAT July 1937. Junkers used both prototypes for extensive flight tests to get experience of the stability and flight controls of large aircraft, but the third prototype V3 was stopped after the programme was cancelled.

In late 1938, both aircraft were transferred to the Luftwaffe, where they were used as heavy transport aircraft.

Both Ju 89 prototypes seem to have been scrapped by the end of 1939, although some sources claim that they were still in use the following year in Norway. During testing, Luft Hansa expressed an interest in an airliner to be developed from the type, which led Junkers to rebuild the incomplete third prototype as the Ju 90.

Specifications (Ju 89 V2)

See also

References

External links

 WW2 in Color

1930s German bomber aircraft
World War II heavy bombers of Germany
Abandoned military aircraft projects of Germany
Ju 089
Four-engined tractor aircraft
Low-wing aircraft
Aircraft first flown in 1937
Four-engined piston aircraft
Twin-tail aircraft